Russell Elcock (born December 6, 1993) is a Barbadian semi-professional road cyclist who started cycling in 2006 at the age of 12 and has several National and Caribbean Championship titles in the years 2008–2016.  He is a Hammer Nutrition sponsored athlete and currently rides for Team Drive Phase Sport based in Trinidad and Tobago. His specialty is the Road Individual Time Trial.  He is a University of the West Indies graduate and is a past Queen's College Barbados student.

Career achievements

Major results

2008
 1st  Time trial, Caribbean Youth Road Championships
 National Youth Road Championships
1st  Time trial
2nd Road race
2009
 Caribbean Youth Road Championships
1st  Time trial
1st  Road race
 National Youth Road Championships
1st  Time trial
1st  Road race
 1st  Individual pursuit, National Youth Track Championships
 1st Nation Fun Ride
2010
 National Junior Road Championships
1st  Time trial
1st  Road race
 National Junior Track Championships
1st  Individual pursuit
2nd Kilo
 2nd  Time trial, Caribbean Youth Road Championships
 3rd Overall Tour of Tobago
1st Young rider classification
1st Stages 2 & 4
2011
 National Junior Road Championships
1st  Time trial
1st  Road race
 1st  Individual pursuit, National Junior Track Championships
2012
 1st  Time trial, National Road Championships (course record holder)
2013
 National Road Championships
1st  Time trial (course record holder)
4th Road race
 2nd John T Memorial Cycling Classic - Anguilla
 10th Time trial, Caribbean Road Championships
2014
 National Road Championships
1st  Time trial (course record holder)
4th Road race
 5th John T Memorial Cycling Classic - Anguilla
2015
 National Road Championships
1st  Time trial
3rd Road race
 Caribbean Road Championships
2nd  Under-23 time trial
3rd  Time trial
 3rd John T Memorial Classic - Anguilla
2016
 National Road Championships
1st  Time trial
2nd Road race
 1st Overall Trinidad and Tobago Cycling Federation Road Series
2017
 2nd Time trial, National Road Championships
 3rd John T Memorial Classic - Anguilla
2020
 2nd Time trial, National Road Championships

Awards
National Sports Council Emerging Athlete of the Year (2009)
National Cyclist of the Year (2009)
Barbados Most Outstanding Youth Road Rider of the Year (2009)
Barbados Most Outstanding Junior Road Rider of the Year (2010, 2011)
Barbados Most Outstanding Elite Road Rider of the Year (2012, 2013)
University of the West Indies, Cave Hill Barbados Athlete of the Month (January 2014)

References

 
 
 

Barbadian male cyclists
Living people
1993 births
Place of birth missing (living people)